The Bulgarian Progressive Line (BPL) is a democratic socialist and left-wing political party in Bulgaria. It has been the successor of the Bulgarian Liberal Party.

History 
The party was created in the winter of 2020–2021 by several progressive deputies of the National Assembly of Bulgaria who split from the Bulgarian Socialist Party. The BPL participated in the April 2021 Bulgarian parliamentary election but did not meet the electoral threshold. The party had 3,751 votes (0.15%).

In July 2021, the party entered the Left Union for a Clean and Holy Republic coalition with the Party of the Bulgarian Communists, the Left Alternative, the Socialist Party "Bulgarian Way", and the party Revival of the Fatherland.

Election results

References 

2021 establishments in Bulgaria
Democratic socialist parties in Europe
Political parties established in 2021
Socialist parties in Bulgaria